The Little Prince is a Swiss-French stereoscopic computer-animated children's television series inspired by Antoine de Saint-Exupéry's novel of the same name that began broadcast in late 2010 on France 3. The series was created by Method Animation and the Saint-Exupéry-d'Agay Estate Production, in co-production with LPPTV, Sony Pictures Home Entertainment, Fabrique d'Images, DQ Entertainment and ARD, in participation with France Télévisions, WDR, Rai Fiction, Télévision Suisse Romande and TV5Monde.

The series aired in over 150 markets around the world. It was distributed as 36 mini-movies, each encompassing an individual story line, as well as 78 half hour episodes, where those story arcs are split into multiple parts. An English version, created by Ocean Productions, began airing in Canada on TVOntario on November 6, 2011. It also began airing on Knowledge Network on January 8, 2012. In Australia, it began airing on ABC3 on August 19, 2012. In the United States, the series launched alongside Primo TV on January 16, 2017.

This list is organized according to the show's French broadcast.

Series overview

Episodes

Season 1 (2010-11)

Season 2 (2012-13)

Season 3 (2014-15)

Home media
In France, Sony Pictures Home Entertainment released the first two seasons of the series on DVD between November 2010 and November 2013. Sony also released the first two mini-movies on DVD in French Canada. This was followed by a release of the third season by Unidisc.

In the United States, NCircle Entertainment released 18 episodes (in the mini-movie format) of the series across six DVDs between 2016 and 2018.

Notes

References

2010 French television seasons